Inese Vaidere (born 3 September 1952) is a Latvian politician who currently serves as a Member of the European Parliament (MEP).

Political career

Role in national politics
Vaidere was Minister of State for the Environment in the Krištopans cabinet from 1998 to 1999, Vice-Mayor of Riga from 2001 to 2002 and a member of  the Saeima from 2002 to 2004.

Member of the European Parliament, 2004–present
Vaidere was elected to the European Parliament in 2004 from the For Fatherland and Freedom/LNNK list and sat with the Union for a Europe of Nations group. In 2009 she was elected from the Civic Union list and sat with the European People's Party group.

Between 2004 and 2014, Vaidere was a member of the Committee on Foreign Affairs and the Subcommittee on Human Rights. In 2013, she drafted the parliament's report on the impact of the financial and economic crisis on human rights, which calls for the EU to help developing countries create social-protection schemes.

In 2014, Vaidere was placed 6th on the Unity list and was preferenced 5th by voters. Unity won 4 of Latvia's European Parliament seats and she was not elected. However the first candidate elected on the list, Valdis Dombrovskis, became the European Commissioner for the Euro and Social Dialogue on 1 November 2014 and ceased to be an MEP. Vaidere, as next in line on the Unity list, replaced him in the Parliament.

From 2014 until 2019, Vaidere was a member of the Committee on Budgets. Since 2019, she has been serving on the Committee on Economic and Monetary Affairs. In addition to her committee assignments, she is a member of the European Parliament Intergroup on Integrity (Transparency, Anti-Corruption and Organized Crime), the European Parliament Intergroup on Traditional Minorities, National Communities and Languages, the European Parliament Intergroup on Small and Medium-Sized Enterprises (SMEs), the European Parliament Intergroup on the Digital Agenda and the European Internet Forum.

Political positions
Vaidere is a signatory of the Prague Declaration on European Conscience and Communism.

In 2015, news media reported that Vaidere was included in a Russian blacklist of prominent people from the European Union who are not allowed to enter the country.

References 

1952 births
Living people
People from Jelgava
People deported from Latvia
Latvian National Independence Movement politicians
For Fatherland and Freedom/LNNK politicians
Civic Union (Latvia) politicians
New Unity politicians
Deputies of the 8th Saeima
For Fatherland and Freedom/LNNK MEPs
Civic Union (Latvia) MEPs
MEPs for Latvia 2004–2009
MEPs for Latvia 2009–2014
MEPs for Latvia 2014–2019
MEPs for Latvia 2019–2024
Women MEPs for Latvia
University of Latvia alumni
Academic staff of the University of Latvia
21st-century Latvian women politicians
Women deputies of the Saeima